Kronichthys lacerta is a species of armored catfish endemic to Brazil where it occurs in the Baia de Paranaguá and Ribeira de Iguape River basins.  This species grows to a length of  SL.

References 
 

Loricariidae
Taxa named by John Treadwell Nichols
Catfish of South America
Endemic fauna of Brazil
Freshwater fish of Brazil
Environment of Paraná (state)
Environment of São Paulo (state)
Fish described in 1919